The Scotichronicon is a 15th-century chronicle by the Scottish historian Walter Bower. It is a continuation of historian-priest John of Fordun's earlier work Chronica Gentis Scotorum beginning with the founding of Ireland and thereby Scotland by Scota with Goídel Glas.

The work

Bower began the work in 1440 at the request of a neighbour, Sir David Stewart of Rosyth. The completed work, in its original form, consists of 16 books, of which the first five and a portion of the sixth (to 1163) are Fordun's, or mainly his, for Bower added to them at places. In the later books, down to the reign of Robert I (1371), he was aided by Fordun's Gesta Annalia, but from that point to the close, the work is original and of contemporary importance, especially for James I, with whose death it ends. The task was finished in 1447.

Abridgments
Bower engaged in a reduction or "abridgment" of the Scotichronicon in the last two years of his life, which is known as the Book of Cupar, and which is preserved in the Advocates' library, Edinburgh (MS. 35. 1. 7). Other abridgments, not by Bower, were made about the same time, one about 1450 (perhaps by Patrick Russell, a Carthusian of Perth) preserved in the Advocates' library (MS. 35. 6. 7) and another in 1461 by an unknown writer, also preserved in the same collection (MS. 35. 5. 2). Copies of the full text of the Scotichronicon, by different scribes, are extant. There are two in the British Library, in The Black Book of Paisley, and in Harley MS 712; one in the Advocates' library, from which Walter Goodall printed his edition (Edinburgh, 1759), and one in the library of Corpus Christi College, Cambridge.

Importance
The National Library of Scotland has called it "probably the most important medieval account of early Scottish history", noting that it provides both a strong expression of national identity and a window into the world view of medieval commentators.

Robert Hood entry 
In contrast to the 1283 entry for Robin Hood by Andrew of Wyntoun in his Orygynale Cronykil of Scotland, Bower placed Robert (Robin) Hood in 1266. By changing the date of Wyntoun's entry, Bower removed Wyntoun's association of the outlaw with the national heroes, William Wallace and Robert the Bruce, and substituted an association with the rebellion by Simon de Montfort, 6th Earl of Leicester against Henry III of England. (Note the reference to Robert Hood being one of "the disinherited", the term applied to de Montfort's followers.) Bower calls Robert Hood a 'famosus siccarius' (Latin for famous cutthroat), who nevertherless donated his ill-gotten gains to the Church and held the servants of the Church in high regard.

Bower's tale is similar to the beginning of Robin Hood and the Monk (Child 119). One of the earliest-known tales of Robin Hood, the manuscript is dated to no earlier than 1450, and is housed at Cambridge University library. This Latin summary and Robin Hood and the Monk are probably as close to the rhymes of Robin Hood described by Langland in 1377 as scholars can get.

Criticism
Bower has been described as a less competent chronicler than Fordun, with one commenter calling him "garrulous, irrelevant and inaccurate" and noting that he "makes every important occurrence an excuse for a long-winded moral discourse".

References

External links

A History Book for Scots: Selections from the Scotichronicon:Walter Bower, Scotichronicon, ed. D. E. R. Watt and others, 9 volumes (1987–1998).
The Manipulus/Scotichronicon Project: A revised edition of select chapters in Watt's edition, by C. Nighman.
Robin Hood and the Monk (Text):Robin Hood Project, University of Rochester

15th-century history books
History books about Scotland
Scottish chronicles
15th century in Scotland
National Library of Scotland